Milton Nesvig (1914 or 1915–1990) first came to Pacific Lutheran College in 1947 as director of public relations and a professor of English. In 1966 he became vice president of University Relations, retiring from full-time duties in 1980 and becoming the university’s part-time archivist until 1987. He received recognition awards for his service to higher education, including PLU’s Distinguished Alumnus Award in 1986. He was known as "Mr. PLU". He was the university's ambassador, traveling in the United States and abroad. The Nesvig Alumni Center is named after him.

References

1990 deaths
Year of birth uncertain